Nubeluz was a Peruvian children's show airing from 1990 to 1996.  The show was produced by Peru's Panamericana Television and aired through its nationwide network (Channel 5 in Lima), who credit the General Production to Rochi Hernandez. The show was written by Alonso Alegria, Maritza Kirchhausen, Catalina Lohmann, Clara María Cavagnaro and Fernando Gagliuffi, and was usually hosted by two or three young girls called Dalinas (a possible portmanteau of "dama linda", or "pretty lady" in English).

History
Nubeluz's main contribution to the genre was the creation of an alternative world made of 'nube' (cloud) and 'luz' (light), with its own language, called 'glúfico', and its own peculiar manners and customs, where two weekly fiestas were held (the terms 'program' or 'show' were never used).

Nubeluz featured several competitions between children (and even adults on occasion) divided into two colored teams, always red and yellow, plus songs and dances, some with overt messages, performed by the Dalinas, interspersed with cartoons. The female back-up dancers were called Cíndelas, and the male back-up dancers were known as Gólmodis.  The competition was also set to its own musical score, played in the background exclusively while competition was in progress.  This musical score included an acoustic, instrumental remix of the song "Rock This Town" by the Stray Cats.

During the competitions, the Gólmodis were in charge of assisting and spotting the competitors.  However, the Gólmodis were also in control of the swinging demolition pads during one of the competition's toughest events, "Glufiadores". The Cíndelas were in charge of handing out the prizes at the end of each event, as well as wrapping towels around the competitors at the end of events that involved getting wet.

Numerous well-known singing groups, as well as other noted personalities, most of them well known in Latin America, made special guest appearances on the show at various times during its run.  They performed their own songs or showed off their own talents.  They frequently even experienced the show's competition first-hand during their guest appearance.

The show enjoyed great success and was soon broadcast in many Latin American countries. Moreover, it began to be broadcast to other countries, such as China, Turkey, Egypt, The Philippines, and the United States among others. However, the suicide of one of the main hostesses, Mónica Santa María, was a turning point that lead to its decline. The show finally ended in 1996. However, it was rebroadcast in other countries such as Venezuela with a whole new cast.

It has been confirmed that a pilot for a new version of the show was shot in March 2008 in Peru, having 4 new dalinas.

Cast

Dalinas (Argentina)
 Almendra Gomelsky (1990–95)

Dalinas (Colombia)
 Xiomara Xibille (1993–95)

Dalinas (Perú)

 Mónica Santa María (1990–94)
 Almendra Gomelsky (1990–94)
 Lilianne Kubiliun (1992–94)
 Karina Calmet (1995)

Dalinas (Venezuela)
 Scarlet Ortiz (1995–96)
 Gaby Espino (1995–96)
 Concetta Lo Dolce (1995–96)

Magazine
PLAK was the official magazine for Nubeluz.

Antuané and Anabel Elías (1990–1994), Elvira Villa (1991–1996), Rossana Fernández-Maldonado, Maria Pía Ureta, Noelia Cogorno, Daniela Sarfaty and siblings Claudia and Franco Nagaro shared the role of Cindelas and Golmodis.

Nubeluz was originally created for broadcast in Spanish and in Peru. In the mid-1990s an English-language pilot appeared, starring Monica Potter as the first American Dalina.  The 1995 season also featured a character called Glufo, much like the American Barney the Dinosaur, who was large with rainbow colored fur, a loud distorted voice, and ears that wiggled. During its final two seasons, Nubeluz was relocated to Venezuela.

References

External links
 

Children's game shows
Children's musical groups
1990s children's television series
1990 Peruvian television series debuts
1996 Peruvian television series endings
1990s Peruvian television series
Panamericana Televisión original programming
Television shows featuring puppetry